The Château et cimetière de Châtenois is a ruined castle and a cemetery in the commune of Châtenois, in the department of Bas-Rhin, Alsace, France. It is a listed historical monument since 1932.

References

Ruined castles in Bas-Rhin
Monuments historiques of Bas-Rhin